Mamillariella is a monotypic genus of moss in family Leskeaceae. It only contain one known species; Mamillariella geniculata, Laz.

References

Hypnales
Taxonomy articles created by Polbot
Moss genera